Hirallli Chenniah Dasappa was an Indian politician. He was elected to the Lok Sabha, the Lower House of the Parliament from Bangalore in Mysore State in 1957 and 1962 as a member of the Indian National Congress.

He served as the Railway Minister of India under Jawaharlal Nehru in 1963-64.

References

External links
 Official biographical sketch in Parliament of India website

1894 births
1964 deaths
Lok Sabha members from Karnataka
Rajya Sabha members from Karnataka
India MPs 1957–1962
India MPs 1962–1967
Members of the Cabinet of India
Railway Ministers of India
Indian National Congress politicians from Karnataka
Politicians from Bangalore
People from Kodagu district
Ministers of Power of India
Commerce and Industry Ministers of India